Chinaqucha (Quechua china female, qucha lake, "female lake", Hispanicized spelling Chinacocha) is a lake in Peru located in the Apurímac Region, Grau Province, Curpahuasi District. It is situated east of Urququcha (Quechua for "male lake").

References 

Lakes of Peru
Lakes of Apurímac Region